Ponjeravah (meaning wonder bridge) is a hamlet near to and east of Constantine in Cornwall, England.

References

Hamlets in Cornwall